Salman Al-Farsi Mosque is a mosque located in the village of Salman Pak in the Mada’in district, approximately  southeast of Baghdad, Iraq. It is one of the holy sites in Iraq. The shrine has historically been a Sunni mosque; however in more recent years it has been handed over to the Shia Muslims. The mosque is named after Salman al-Farsi, a companion of the Islamic prophet Muhammad, and contains his mausoleum.

Construction 
The mosque has four domes and one minaret with a blue dome. In the courtyard, there is a large summer chapel, a place for ablutions and facilities in one of the corners.

The mausoleum of Salman al-Farsi, a companion of the Islamic prophet Muhammad,  is located under the central dome. The grave and sarcophagus itself, is under a Zarih.

Salman Farsi's mosque and shrine consist of three buildings, one of which being the main building that includes Salman Farsi's tomb and the mosque. The second building, is the mausoleum of Hudhaifa ibn Al Yaman and the third building contains the shrine of Jabir ibn Abd Allah and Tahir ibn Muhammad Al-Baqir.

Incidents 

On February 24, 2006, Salafi-Sunni militants fired two rockets at the mosque, causing damage but no casualties.

Gallery

See also

 Islam in Iraq
 List of mosques in Iraq

References

External links
http://al-mataf.com/subpages.aspx?lg=en&sec=footer&cid=400

Shia shrines
Shrines in Iraq
Shia mosques in Iraq
Sunni mosques in Iraq
Mausoleums in Iraq